The Grand Rapids City League (GRCL) was a high school athletic league in Grand Rapids, Michigan. The GRCL originated in the spring of 1928 when seven Grand Rapids high schools competed in the first City Track Meet on May 18-19. The meet doubled as the Michigan High School Athletic Association (MHSAA) Class A Regional Meet. Catholic Central, Central, Creston, Davis Tech, Ottawa Hills, South and Union competed in the meet under the direction of newly appointed City League athletic director Henry Lightner. The league's final membership consisted of the four public high schools of the Grand Rapids Public Schools (Central, Creston, Ottawa Hills and Union) plus Catholic Central, West Catholic and Christian.

The last league secretary was Melvin Atkins, the Grand Rapids Public Schools' Executive Director of Athletics and Activities. This made the GRCL among the few athletic conferences administered by a public school district that has a significant non-public school membership.

Due to a lack of parity and competitiveness within the league because of changing enrollment figures and demographic shifts, the Grand Rapids City League had attempted in 2004 to disband and join the larger Ottawa-Kent Conference, which the majority of schools in metropolitan Grand Rapids are members of. The Ottawa-Kent Conference rejected the Grand Rapids Public Schools while extending an invitation to the three private schools. The member schools decided to keep the league intact and reapplied for Ottawa-Kent Conference membership in 2006. On February 8, 2007 the Ottawa-Kent Conference voted to invite the City League schools for membership. The 2007-2008 school year was the last year of competition for the City League as all schools accepted the invitation to join the Ottawa-Kent Conference.

Members
The following high schools, all within the City of Grand Rapids, were the final members of the Grand Rapids City League:

 Grand Rapids Catholic Central High School
 Grand Rapids Central High School (earlier called Grand Rapids High School)
 Grand Rapids Christian High School
 Grand Rapids Creston High School
 Grand Rapids Ottawa Hills High School
 Grand Rapids Union High School
 Grand Rapids West Catholic High School

Membership History

Davis Technical High School was a member of the Grand Rapids City League from the 1920s until 1943, when its building was turned over to Grand Rapids Junior College. Grand Rapids South High School, alma mater of former U.S. President Gerald R. Ford, was a league member until the school was closed in 1967.

Grand Rapids West Catholic High School was established in 1961, began varsity boys basketball a year later in 1962-1963 as an independent, and then joined the City League for the 1963-1964 school year. However, West Catholic's varsity football team did not have its first season until 1963-1964 and played as an independent for two years before entering league competition in 1965-1966.  

Also, from 1964-1965 through 1971-1972, Grand Rapids Christian High School was divided into Central Christian and East Christian high schools. Central Christian joined the league in 1964-1965 and East Christian became a member in 1965-1966. The Central and East Christian football teams played as independents from their first years in 1967-1968 through their last seasons in 1971-1972. The reunited Grand Rapids Christian High began participation in the City League in 1972-1973, with the football team starting league play in 1973-1974.

The Grand Rapids City League's last competitions were held in the 2007-2008 school year. The league's member schools joined the Ottawa-Kent Conference prior to the 2008-2009 school year.

Membership timeline

State championships
Grand Rapids City League member high schools won the following state championships (all Michigan High School Athletic Association unless noted):

Grand Rapids Catholic Central Cougars
 1943 football (mythical championship)
 1949 football (Detroit Free Press & mythical championship)
 1951 football (Detroit Free Press)
 1959 football (Associated Press & Detroit Free Press)
 1982 boys' cross country
 1984 boys' cross country
 1985 baseball
 1987 football
 1987 girls' cross country
 1999 competitive cheer

Grand Rapids Central Rams
 1896 football (mythical championship)
 1900 boys' track and field (pre-MHSAA)
 1907 boys' track and field (pre-MHSAA)
 1912 football (mythical championship)
 1913 boys' track and field (pre-MHSAA)
 1916 boys' track and field (pre-MHSAA)
 1917 boys' track and field (pre-MHSAA)
 1931 boys' tennis
 1932 boys' tennis
 1932 football (mythical championship)
 1933 boys' tennis

Grand Rapids Central Christian Eagles
 none

Grand Rapids Christian Eagles
 1938 boys' basketball
 1979 girls' cross country
 1980 girls' track and field
 1997 girls' basketball
 1998 boys' soccer
 2001 girls' team track and field (MITCA)
 2001 boys' soccer
 2002 girls' team track and field (MITCA)
 2003 equestrian (MIHA)
 2005 girls' cross country
 2006 girls' cross country
 2007 girls' team track and field (MITCA)

Grand Rapids Creston Polar Bears
 1980 girls' volleyball

Grand Rapids Davis Technical
 1945 Boys Tennis

Grand Rapids East Christian Panthers
 1966 boys' basketball
 1966 boys' cross country

Grand Rapids Ottawa Hills Indians/Bengals
 1932 boys' track & field 
 1934 boys' track & field 
 1934 boys' golf
 1934 boys' tennis 
 1938 boys' tennis 
 1951 boys' track & field 
 1952 boys' golf 
 1968 boys' basketball 
 1969 boys' basketball 
 1989 girls' basketball 
 1997 boys' basketball

Grand Rapids South Trojans
 1924 football (mythical championship)
 1928 boys' tennis
 1929 boys' tennis
 1930 boys' cross country
 1944 football (mythical championship)

Grand Rapids Union Red Hawks
 1925 football (mythical championship per Associated Press article)
 1931 football (mythical championship)
 1932 boys' golf
 1948 football (Detroit Free Press & mythical championship)
 1952 boys' cross country
 1953 boys' cross country

Grand Rapids West Catholic Falcons
 1979 girls' basketball
 1984 gymnastics
 1990 girls' basketball
 2003 boys' cross country
 2004 boys' team track and field (MITCA)
 2008 boys' team track and field (MITCA)
 2008 girls' team track and field (MITCA)

Notable alumni
Notable alumni who participated athletically in the Grand Rapids City League (or participated for a school that later joined the City League) include the following:
 Thomas Kelley,  Grand Rapids Union High School, Basketball, Michigan State University
 George Andrie, Catholic Central High School (Grand Rapids, Michigan), Football, Marquette University, Dallas Cowboys
 Lacy Jones, Grand Rapids Ottawa Hills High School, Basketball, Youngstown State, Central Michigan University is 
 Terry Barr, Grand Rapids Central High School, Football
 Harry Berrios, Grand Rapids Ottawa Hills High School, Baseball, Football
 Hugh Blacklock, Grand Rapids Central High School, Football
 Robert E Brady, Grand Rapids South High School, Football, basketball, track, Michigan State University
 Carlton Brewster, Grand Rapids Creston High School, Football
 Kelly Butler, Grand Rapids Union High School, Football, Purdue University
 Geno Carlisle, Grand Rapids Ottawa Hills High School, Basketball, University of California at Berkeley
 Chuck DeShane, Grand Rapids Creston High School, Football, Detroit Lions
 Doug DeVos, Grand Rapids Christian High School, Football, Purdue University
 Richard DeVos, Grand Rapids Christian High School
 Clarence Ellis, Grand Rapids Central High School, Football, Track and Field
 Gerald R. Ford, Grand Rapids South High School, Football
 David Harris, Grand Rapids Ottawa Hills High School, Football, University of Michigan, New York Jets
 Mike Kadish, Catholic Central High School (Grand Rapids, Michigan), Football
 Mike Keller, Catholic Central High School (Grand Rapids, Michigan), Football
 Stanley Ketchel, Grand Rapids Union High School, Boxing, World Champion
 George Kok, Grand Rapids Ottawa Hills High School, Basketball
 Alvin Loucks, Grand Rapids Union High School, Football
 Bob Lurtsema, Grand Rapids Ottawa Hills High School, Football, New York Giants
 Floyd Mayweather Jr., Grand Rapids Ottawa Hills High School
 Greg Meyer, Grand Rapids West Catholic High School, Cross Country, Track and Field, Boston Marathon, Olympics
 Rick Miller, Grand Rapids Union High School, Football, Basketball, Baseball
 Duke Mondy, Grand Rapids Catholic Central, Basketball, Providence, Oakland
 Mike Prindle, Grand Rapids Union High School, Football, Western Michigan University
 Rueben Riley, Grand Rapids Creston High School, Football
 Dave Rozema, Grand Rapids Central High School, Baseball, Detroit Tigers
 Joe Soboleski, Catholic Central High School (Grand Rapids, Michigan),Football
 Derrick Spearman, Grand Rapids Union High School, Football, Basketball, Baseball, Track, NLU
 Mickey Stanley, Grand Rapids Ottawa Hills High School, Baseball
 Frank Steketee, Grand Rapids Central High School, Football

Michigan high school sports conferences
High school sports conferences and leagues in the United States
Sports in Grand Rapids, Michigan
1928 establishments in Michigan